Manage the Damage is the 1999 third solo album by pop singer Jimmy Somerville.

Track listing
All tracks composed by Jimmy Somerville and Sally Herbert; except where indicated
 "Here I Am"
 "Lay Down (Contact)" (Serge Gainsbourg)
 "Dark Sky"
 "My Life"
 "Something to Live For" (Ed Monaghan)
 "This Must Be Love"
 "Girl Falling Down"
 "Someday Soon"
 "Eve"
 "Stone"
 "Rolling"
 "Something To Live For" (Radio Mix) [UK Bonus Track]

Personnel
Jimmy Somerville - vocals
Sally Herbert - programming, string arrangement
Gary Butcher, Greg Bone - guitar
Nick Nasmyth - keyboards
James Sanger - omnichord
Colin Smith - saxophone
Simon Elms - flugelhorn
Adrian Lee - trombone
Dinah Beamish, Sophie Harris - cello
Anne Stephenson, Gini Ball, Julia Singleton, Sonia Slany - violin
Claire Orsler, Jocelyn Pook - viola
Dee Lewis, Gillian Wisdom, Paul Jason Fredericks, Trevor Conner - backing vocals

External links
Jimmy Somerville's official website

References 

Jimmy Somerville albums
1999 albums